C. flavescens may refer to:

 Callista flavescens, a tropical orchid
 Caloplaca flavescens, a crustose lichen
 Calytrix flavescens, a shrub endemic to Australia
 Camponotus flavescens, a carpenter ant
 Canna flavescens, a garden plant
 Catocala flavescens, an Indian moth
 Celeus flavescens, a South American woodpecker
 Cephalostachyum flavescens, an Asian bamboo
 Ceratostylis flavescens, a flowering plant
 Chaetobranchus flavescens, a South American fish
 Chamaesciadium flavescens, a flowering plant
 Charaphloeus flavescens, a lined flat bark beetle
 Chemnitzia flavescens, a sea snail
 Chionochloa flavescens, a tussock grass
 Chira flavescens, a jumping spider
 Clathrus flavescens, a saprobic stinkhorn
 Cleistanthus flavescens, a near threatened plant
 Cnidocampa flavescens, an Asian moth
 Cnodalia flavescens, an orb-weaver spider
 Coccophagus flavescens, a chalcid wasp
 Conioscinella flavescens, a grass fly
 Conus flavescens, a sea snail
 Cormocephalus flavescens, a large centipede
 Corymbia flavescens, a dicotyledon plant
 Corynebacterium flavescens, a rod-shaped bacterium
 Coryphopterus flavescens, a goby native to the eastern Atlantic Ocean
 Creagrutus flavescens, a South American characin
 Cresponea flavescens, a lichenized fungus
 Crocidura flavescens, a white-toothed shrew
 Cryptococcus flavescens, a dimorphic fungus
 Cyperus flavescens, a papyrus sedge
 Cypripedium flavescens, a lady's slipper orchid
 Cyrtopodium flavescens, a flowering plant